The Janseogak refers to an archival collection currently held at the Academy of Korean Studies (Hangukhak jungang yeon'guwon) outside of Seoul, South Korea. The collection focuses on works dealing with traditional Korean history and culture and has its origins in the royal library once held at Changdeok Palace, a primary royal residence in Seoul. Unique holdings of the collection include its large collection of Uigwe, or "royal protocols" dealing with such various subjects as royal wedding processions and construction techniques, the royal genealogies of the Joseon dynasty, cartographic materials, and traditional Korean novels written in hangeul script.

See also 
Yiwangjik

External link 
Jangseogak of the Academy of Korean Studies

Archives in South Korea